The Perana Performance Group is a South African car developer located in Port Elizabeth. It is the second manufacturer that uses the Perana brand name after the famous Basil Green Motors. The company was founded in late 2007. The cars are manufactured in the Hi-Tech plant of Hi-Tech Automotive & Superformance.

By 2012 Superformance partnered with AC Cars and the Perana was renamed the AC 378 GT Zagato. Reportedly there are about ten pre-production models completed.

The Z-One

The  Z-One was first presented to the public in 2009,  designed by Italian automotive design studio Zagato, it is based on the chassis of the Chevrolet Corvette (C6), an American sports car.

Movie
 Presentation of the Perana Z-One on Moto24.tv (YouTube video)

External links
 Official website of the Perana Performance Group (Retrieved 9 October 2013) (English) (Link is broken)
 The Perana Z-One on aada-african-car.blogspot.com
 The Perana Z-One on autobild.de
 The Perana Z-One on speed-magazin.de
 The Perana Z-One on n24.de

References

Car manufacturers of South Africa
Economy of the Eastern Cape
Port Elizabeth
South African companies established in 2007

fr:Perana#Perana depuis 2007